Gilbert Edward George Lariston Elliot-Murray-Kynynmound, 6th Earl of Minto,  (19 June 1928 – 7 September 2005) (nicknamed "Gibbie"), styled Viscount Melgund until 1975, was a Scottish peer.

Background and life 
Lord Minto was the son of Victor Elliot-Murray-Kynynmound, 5th Earl of Minto and Marion Cook.

He attended Eton and the Royal Military Academy at Sandhurst, and served in the Scots Guards until 1958. In 1955 he was appointed a military MBE. He was an honorary lieutenant of the Royal Company of Archers (Queen's Bodyguard in Scotland). He served as a Justice of the Peace for Roxburghshire from 1961 onwards. He succeeded his father as Earl in 1975. He served as president of the South of Scotland Chamber of Commerce from 1980 to 1982, chair of the Scottish Council on Alcohol (1973-1987), and a commissioner of the Local Government Property Commission (Scotland) from 1995-1998.

The earl was awarded the OBE in 1986. He was Vice Lord Lieutenant of Roxburgh, Ettrick and Lauderdale.

In 1992, Minto House, the traditional family seat near the village of Minto but not occupied by the family since before the Second World War, was demolished in accordance with the Earl's wishes, despite it being a listed building. Minto House was listed as Category A, and largely demolished within weeks. The Earl was at that time convenor of the Borders Regional Council, which held regulatory jurisdiction over such actions.

Family
Lord Minto married Lady Caroline Child-Villiers (born 9 April 1934), daughter of George Child Villiers, 9th Earl of Jersey and Patricia Kenneth Richards, on 26 November 1952. They had two children:

 Timothy Elliot-Murray-Kynynmound, 7th Earl of Minto [formerly Viscount Melgund] (born 1 December 1953); who is married and has three surviving children.
 Lady Laura Elliot-Murray-Kynynmound (born 11 March 1956) who married in 1984, John Reginald David Palmer, son of William Palmer, and has issue, two sons.

Lord and Lady Minto were divorced in 1965. In 1965 Lord Minto married, secondly, Mary Elizabeth Ballantine (29 December 1936 — 24 January 1983), daughter of Peter Ballantine, of Stonehouse Farm, Gladstone, New Jersey, United States. The marriage lasted until her death in 1983. He married, thirdly, in 1991 (divorced 2004) to Mrs Caroline Larlham, née Godfrey (b. 1952).

Death
Lord Minto died after a fall, and due to severe lung disease that rendered an operation impossible, at the age of 77 in a nursing home. His funeral took place on Monday, 12 September 2005 at Minto Parish Church, near Hawick, Scottish Borders. His estate has been the subject of a dispute between his third wife and his son.

References

External links

People from the Scottish Borders
Earls in the Peerage of the United Kingdom
1928 births
2005 deaths
Officers of the Order of the British Empire
Place of birth missing
Place of death missing
Scots Guards officers
Graduates of the Royal Military Academy Sandhurst
20th-century British Army personnel
People educated at Eton College
Minto